Massimo Troisi (19 February 1953 – 4 June 1994) was an Italian actor, cabaret performer, screenwriter, and film director. He is best known for his works in the films I'm Starting from Three (1981) and Il Postino: The Postman (1994), for which he was posthumously nominated for two Oscars. Nicknamed "the comedian of feelings," he is considered one of the most important actors of Italian theater and cinema.

Early years and TV star 
Troisi was born into a large family in San Giorgio a Cremano, a town near Naples. His father Alfredo was a train engineer. Some of his family experiences were later told in his first films. After secondary school, Troisi wrote some poems inspired by his favourite author, Pier Paolo Pasolini, and, in 1969, started to play in a small local theatre together with some childhood friends (including Lello Arena and Enzo Decaro). The early death of his mother condemned Troisi to a harsh period of activity, which is said to have had a role in the development of his increasingly serious heart problems which were brought on during his teenage years from bouts of rheumatic fever. (In 1976 he had to visit the United States for a heart valve operation, the expenses for which were paid with the help of his friends.)

Troisi started his artistic career as a cabaret showman in 1972, as a member of the comic trio called "I Saraceni" ("The Saracens") and, later, "La Smorfia" (from the name of the "book of the numbers" traditionally used in Naples for lottery and tombola, but also meaning "the face", as in "to make a face"). His mates were De Caro and Arena. They gained national fame on the radio and increased it consistently from 1977 onwards eventually becoming TV stars with the shows Non Stop, La sberla (1978) and Luna Park (1979). Troisi soon gained the status of leader of the trio. He was noted for his use of facial mimicry and of apparently confused speech—in these he drew inspiration from such famous figures of Neapolitan comedy as Totò, and Eduardo and Peppino De Filippo.

Cinema 
Troisi wrote, directed, and starred in his first film, Ricomincio da tre ("I Start Over from Three") in 1981. He achieved wide success and critical praise, establishing himself as one of the most talented new Italian directors of the 1980s. Like his second film, Ricomincio da tre is centered on the troublesome love life of a Neapolitan character, partly inspired by Troisi's youth, as well as featuring Lello Arena. Scusate il ritardo, similar to the preceding one, was released in 1983, and had Giuliana De Sio as co-star.

Troisi starred opposite Roberto Benigni in Non ci resta che piangere (1984), in which they play two friends who are accidentally transported back in time to the 15th century; there they meet Leonardo da Vinci and, upon realising which age they are in, travel to Spain to try to stop Christopher Columbus from discovering the Americas.

After some small acting roles, in 1987 Troisi directed Le vie del Signore sono finite, set during the Fascist era. The film won a Silver Ribbon for best screenplay. In the following years, he starred alongside Marcello Mastroianni, in Ettore Scola's Splendor (1989), Che ora è? (1989, who earned him and Mastroianni the Volpi Cup for Best Actor) and Il viaggio di Capitan Fracassa (1990). His last film as director (also as screenwriter and actor) was Pensavo fosse amore, invece era un calesse (1991), again centering on the everyday difficulties of love between a man and a woman (portrayed by Francesca Neri).

Il Postino and death 
Troisi came to international fame through the success of Il Postino: The Postman, directed by Michael Radford. Troisi died in 1994 of a heart attack in his sister's house at Infernetto, Rome, twelve hours after the main filming on Il Postino had finished. It was reported that he postponed surgery to complete the film.

He was posthumously nominated for Academy Awards for Best Actor and Best Writing for Il Postino, and was the sixth person to be posthumously nominated for an acting Academy Award. (Earlier posthumous nominations were Jeanne Eagels, James Dean [twice], Spencer Tracy, Peter Finch [won] and Sir Ralph Richardson.)

Pino Daniele worked on the soundtracks of most of his films. Eduardo De Filippo, the most prominent Italian dramatist of the 20th century with Luigi Pirandello, said he was "a comedian of the future, rooted in the past".

Filmography

Director 
 Ricomincio da tre (1981)
 Morto Troisi, viva Troisi! (1982, TV special)
 Scusate il ritardo (1983)
 Non ci resta che piangere (1984, with Roberto Benigni)
 Le vie del Signore sono finite (1987)
 Pensavo fosse amore, invece era un calesse (1991)

Screenwriter 
 Ricomincio da tre (1981)
 Morto Troisi, viva Troisi! (1982)
 No grazie, il caffè mi rende nervoso (1982)
 Scusate il ritardo (1983)
 Non ci resta che piangere (1984)
 Le vie del Signore sono finite (1987)
 Pensavo fosse amore, invece era un calesse (1991)
 Il Postino: The Postman (1994)

Actor 
 Ricomincio da tre (1981) - Gaetano
 Morto Troisi, viva Troisi! (1982, TV Movie) - La salma / Il tecnico delle luci / Himself
 No grazie, il caffè mi rende nervoso (1982) - Troisi
 Scusate il ritardo (1983) - Vincenzo
 "FF.SS." – Cioè: "...che mi hai portato a fare sopra a Posillipo se non mi vuoi più bene?" (1983)
 Non ci resta che piangere (1984) - Mario
 Hotel Colonial (1986) - Werner
 Le vie del Signore sono finite (1987) - Camillo
 Splendor (1989) - Luigi
 Che ora è? (1989) - Michele, the son
 Il viaggio di Capitan Fracassa (1990) - Pulcinella
 Pensavo fosse amore, invece era un calesse (1991) - Tommaso
 Il Postino: The Postman (1994) - Mario Ruoppolo (final film role)

In popular culture

In 2023, a documentary film on Troisi, titled as Massimo Troisi: Somebody Down There Likes Me was made directed by Mario Martone. The film had its premiere at 73rd Berlin International Film Festival on 17 February 2023.

References

External links 
 
 A website for those who hold Massimo in their hearts

1953 births
1994 deaths
Italian male film actors
Italian male comedians
Italian cabaret performers 
Italian film directors
20th-century Italian screenwriters
Italian male screenwriters
People from San Giorgio a Cremano
David di Donatello winners
Nastro d'Argento winners
Volpi Cup for Best Actor winners
20th-century Italian male actors
20th-century Italian comedians
20th-century Italian male writers